Davide is an Italian given name (common) and an Italian/Filipino surname (relatively rare), and may refer to:

Given name
 Davide Alviti (born 1996), Italian basketball player
 Davide Ancilotto (1974–1997), Italian basketball player
 Davide Astori (1987-2018), Italian footballer
 Davide Biale (born 1994), Italian Bass Slapper
 Davide Dias (born 1983), a Portuguese footballer
 Davide Faraone (born 1975), Italian politician
 Davide Faraoni (born 1991), Italian footballer
 Davide Lorenzini (born 1969), Italian diver
 Davide Nicola (born 1973), former Italian footballer and manager
 Davide Sanguinetti (born 1972), Italian former tennis player
 Davide Valsecchi (born 1987), Italian racing driver
 Davide Santon (born 1991) Italian footballer

Surname
Hilario Davide Jr. (born 1935), Philippine chief justice
Hilario Davide III (born 1964), Filipino politician

See also
David (disambiguation)

References

Italian masculine given names
Italian-language surnames
Tagalog-language surnames